The 2008 Pocono 500 was the fourteenth race of the 2008 NASCAR Sprint Cup schedule and was run on Sunday, June 8 at Pocono Raceway in Long Pond, Pennsylvania.  The race was the first NASCAR telecast on TNT for the 2008 season starting at 12:30 PM US EDT and on radio via MRN and Sirius Satellite Radio at 1:15 PM US EDT.

Pre-race news
Terry Labonte would fill in for Kyle Petty in the #45 Petty Enterprises Dodge for six races as Petty moves upstairs to the broadcast booth. 
Dario Franchitti returns to the #40 Chip Ganassi Racing Dodge following his injury several weeks ago.

Qualifying
Jimmie Johnson started out on the pole position, but almost an hour later, Kasey Kahne bumped him. Dale Earnhardt, Inc. teammates Mark Martin and Regan Smith made up the second row, while Joe Nemechek and Carl Edwards made up their third row.

OP: qualified via owners points

PC: qualified as past champion

PR: provisional

QR: via qualifying race

* - had to qualify on time

Failed to qualify, withdrew, or driver changes:   J.J. Yeley (#96), Kenny Wallace (#87-WD)

Happy Hour
It was anything but happy for points leader Kyle Busch, attempting to race all three series in three days in three sites.  His primary car crashed and will be forced to a back-up car and start from the rear as a result. Also going to the back of the field was Sam Hornish Jr. for the same reason. Carl Edwards ran the fastest lap of the session at 164.769 mph. Eventual race winner Kasey Kahne ran the second lap of the session, which was 0.6 seconds slower than Edwards lap.

Race

Information 
 Elapsed Time: 3:59:36
 Average Speed: 125.209 mph
 Margin of Victory: 3.702 sec
 Cautions: 10 for 38 laps
 Lead Changes: 23
 Leaders: 12
The woes of the #18 team continued into the race, when Kyle Busch crashed into the wall early into the race, and had to replace the nose, finishing dead last in the 43-car field, changing a 142-point lead to a 21-point lead to Jeff Burton. Greg Biffle suffered a pit road speeding penalty late in the race under green, causing him to lose the race. Carl Edwards looked to be a favorite to win the race in the closing laps, but a flat tire under a caution with about 20 laps to go destroyed his chances, as there were 33 cars on the lead lap. As the green flag came out, polesitter Kasey Kahne took the lead with 15 laps remaining from Brian Vickers in the Team Red Bull #83 Toyota and won his second points race of the season within the last three weeks.

Results

Incidents 
 On lap 41, Kurt Busch would lose control of his car exiting turn 1, he slides into the grass and briefly becomes airborne due to the bumpiness of the infield. He would later recover with no significant damage and rally to an 8th-place finish.
 Points leader Kyle Busch would hit the frontstretch wall after unsuccessfully trying to change lanes on lap 48, causing Jamie McMurray to make contact with the left rear corner of his car. The incident causes significant body damage on the entire right side of his car.
 Patrick Carpentier and Sam Hornish Jr. make contact in turn 1 on lap 58, also collecting David Gilliland.
 On lap 82, Clint Bowyer loses control of his car exiting turn 3. Juan Pablo Montoya has nowhere to go, and ends up hitting Bowyer behind the driver's door on the left side of the car. Bowyer spins and eventually finds the pit road wall where his car comes to a stop. Montoya's car is on fire and he limps to the end of pit road where he exits the car. Bowyer later returns to finish the race 45 laps down, and Montoya parks his car after 157 laps.
 Michael Waltrip would hit the turn 1 outside retaining wall on lap 106.
 Dario Franchitti would spin in turn 3 on lap 123.
 Already nursing a damaged race car, Kyle Busch hits the curb in the famed tunnel turn causing him to spin during the cycle of the last green flag pit stops on lap 178. This spin would seal his 43rd-place finish in the event.

References

Pocono 500
Pocono 500
NASCAR races at Pocono Raceway